Narasimhavarman II, popularly known as  Rajamalla, was a ruler of the Pallava kingdom. Narasimhavarman reigned from 690 CE to 725 CE. He is credited with the construction of the Shore Temple, Isvara and Mukunda Temples in Mahabalipuram, the Panamalai Temple in South Arcot, plus the Kailasanathar Temple. Narasimhavarman's reign was period of great literary and architectural advancements and he is often grouped by historians with Mahendravarman I and Narasimhavarman I as one of the greatest Pallava rulers.

Accession to the throne
By the time Narasimhavarman ascended the throne, the Pallavas were by the large most powerful military force in the subcontinent. His father Parameswaravarman I was among the greatest of warrior kings of ancient India, the Amaravati Pallava inscription praises him of being: "As vigorous and strong as lord sambhu (siva)". 

Parameswaravarman I had subdued all his formidable enemies to extend the Pallava empire far and away. Narasimhavarman followed up very well.The Vayalur inscription of Pallavas issued on the eve of the coronation of Narasimhavarman II, gives a lineage of 54 rulers through the epochs of Kritam, Dwaparam and Kali up to emperor Narasimhavarman, this includes 47 kings after Aswattaman, the great warrior ancestor of the Pallavas.

The reign
Narasimhavarman, like of most of Pallava kings before him, was a great militarist. That the Pallavas were recognized as a major power during his period is testified by the fact that he exchanged ambassadors with China.  In general his period was relatively free from major wars and Pallava domination of south east Asia continued.

General of South China
In the 8th century, the Tang dynasty, forged a military alliance with Narasimhavarman II and made him the General of the South China to safeguard from the expanding Tibetan Empire.

Contribution to literature

Narasimhavarman was a skilled dramatist and poet. He wrote many works in Sanskrit. Most of these are missing. His Sanskrit plays had themes from Ramayana, Mahabharatha and puranas. Kutiyattam, which is considered as the most ancient available form of dance drama and is 
still in vogue in Kerala, uses some of his plays (like kailasodharanam) for subject matter and so does chakyar koothu another ancient Tamil dramatized worship service. another play called "kamsavadham" dealing with lord krishna's killing of kamsa also was written by the king.

The Sanskrit litterateur Dandin spent several years in his court and was patronized by the king, but we do not know about his standing as the inscriptions denote considerable level of erudition . Narasimhavarman himself was a great devotee who was credited for having mastered the great agamic worship rituals" like preceptor drona".

For all his accomplishments, Narasimhavarman is mainly remembered as a foremost devotee of lord Shiva and a relentless,truthful, diehard warrior king who made sure that pallava armies remained dominant in the subcontinent. Lord sivan is famously known to have appeared in the king's dream and ordered him to adjourn his coronation because he wanted to first bless an impoverished saint poosalar. This event is very well described in most pallava grants of Narasimhavarman as well as the ones after him.

Religious endowments
Narasimhavarman was a great devotee of Shiva and constructed the Kailasanathar Temple at Kanchipuram. Narasimhavarman is generally identified with as Kalarsinga Nayanar ( meaning "one who is lion to crowd of evil kings"), one of the 63 Shaiva saints and also a contemporary to many Nayanmar saints like Sundarar, Dandi, Poosalar and his great queen Rangapataka, who was known to be a pious queen. Narasimhavarman is greatly admired for valor. He took many titles like "Ranajaya", and "Sivachudamani". Narasimhavarman also famously declared before Lord Shiva in Tiruvarur alongside Serruthunai, a Nayanmar saint that he considered himself not as a king but a sincere servant of Lord Shiva.

Patronage of architecture

Narasimhavarman's reign was marked by peace and prosperity, and he constructed several beautiful temples. Apart from the Kailasanathar Temple at Kanchipuram, Narasimhavarman also built several other temples, including the Vaikuntha Perumal Temple at Kanchi, Shore Temple at Mahabalipuram. He is also credited with building the Iravatanesvara Temple at Kanchipuram and the Talagirisvara Temple at Panamalai.

Successor
Narasimhavarman's had two sons – Mahendravarman III and Paramesvaravarman II. However, Mahendravarman III predeceased his father, and Paramesvaravarman II succeeded to the throne.

Footnotes

References

 
 
 
 South Indian Inscriptions, Volume 12
 A study on koodiyattam, UNESCO WORLD HERITAGE ART.

6th-century births
6th-century deaths
Pallava kings